Luka Ivanušec (born 26 November 1998) is a Croatian professional footballer who plays as an attacking midfielder for Prva HNL club Dinamo Zagreb and the Croatia national team.

Club career
Born in Varaždin, Ivanušec made his professional debut for Lokomotiva in the Prva HNL on 20 December 2015 against Slaven Belupo. He came on as an 85th-minute substitute for Josip Ćorić as Lokomotiva won 3–0. He didn't make another appearance for the club until the next season in which he made his European club debut on 30 June 2016 against Andorran side Santa Coloma. He started the match and played 60 minutes as Lokomotiva won 3–1. He then scored his first goal for the club on 3 December 2016 against Cibalia. His 73rd-minute goal was the third as Lokomotiva went on to win 4–1 over the last place side.

On 19 August 2019, Ivanušec signed for Croatian champions Dinamo Zagreb, despite interest from Celtic and Olympiacos. He made his debut for Dinamo on 31 August, in a 1–0 derby loss to Hajduk Split at Stadion Poljud. He scored his first goal for Dinamo on 6 November, in a 3–3 draw with Shakhtar Donetsk in the Champions League. After Zoran Mamić was appointed as a manager of the club, Ivanušec became a more significant part of the team. In Mamić's system, Ivanušec simultaneously played as a right winger and an attacking midfielder, switching between the two positions with Lovro Majer during matches. On 26 November 2020, his 22nd birthday, he scored the third goal in the 3–0 victory over Wolfsberg in the Europa League. On 13 December, in a 2–2 derby draw with Rijeka, he scored one of the fastest goals in the history of the Prva HNL, scoring after only 21 seconds. On 11 March 2021, in a 2–0 defeat to Tottenham Hotspur away, Ivanušec was praised for his performance despite the loss, in contrast to the rest of the team.

International career 
Ivanušec made his senior international debut for Croatia on 11 January 2017 against Chile in the 2017 China Cup. He came on as a 90th-minute substitute for Franko Andrijašević as Croatia lost the match on penalties 4–1. He then scored his first international goal for Croatia in the next match against China. He found the net in the 36th minute to give Croatia the lead but China managed to equalize and finish the match 1–1. China eventually won on penalties 4–3. The goal made him the youngest goalscorer in the history of Croatia national team, surpassing Ivan Rakitić.

On 7 June 2019, Ivanušec was selected in Nenad Gračan's 23-man squad for the UEFA Under-21 Euro 2019. He made two appearances at the tournament, in the 1–0 defeat to France and the 3–3 draw with England, as Croatia finished last in their group. In the latter match, he provided Josip Brekalo with an assist for Croatia's third goal. On 9 March 2021, he was once again selected for the UEFA Under-21 Euro 2021, being named in Igor Bišćan's 23-man squad for the group stage of the tournament. He stuck out as one of the best players in the team, as Croatia progressed to the quarter-finals. In the final group game, the 2–1 loss to England on 31 March, Ivanušec made his 27th appearance for the team, becoming its most capped player in history. On 17 May, he was named in Bišćan's 23-man squad for the knockout stage of the tournament, as well as Zlatko Dalić's 26-man squad for UEFA Euro 2020. On 7 June, he was listed in the UEFA Under-21 Euro 2021 Squad of the Tournament.

On 31 October 2022, Ivanušec was named in the preliminary 34-man squad for the 2022 FIFA World Cup, but did not make the final 26.

Career statistics

Club

International

Scores and results list Croatia's goal tally first, score column indicates score after each Ivanušec goal.

Honours
Dinamo Zagreb
Prva HNL: 2019–20, 2020–21
Croatian Cup: 2020–21

Individual
UEFA European Under-21 Championship Team of the Tournament: 2021

References

1998 births
Living people
People from Varaždin
Croatian footballers
Association football midfielders
NK Lokomotiva Zagreb players
GNK Dinamo Zagreb players
Croatian Football League players
Croatia youth international footballers
Croatia under-21 international footballers
Croatia international footballers
UEFA Euro 2020 players